Croatia Airlines Ltd. is the state-owned flag carrier airline of Croatia.  Its headquarters are in Buzin near Zagreb, the capital, and operates domestic and international services mainly to European destinations. Its main hub is Zagreb International Airport with focus cities being Dubrovnik, Split, and Zadar. Since November 2004, the airline has been a member of Star Alliance.

History

Early years

The airline was established on June 1991 with no planes and already with poor economic prospects. Later in 1991, Croatia Airlines signed an agreement with Adria Airways which allowed it to lease a McDonnell Douglas MD-82 to commence domestic jet services between Zagreb and Split. Croatia Airlines acquired three Boeing 737s from Lufthansa and became a member of the International Air Transport Association (IATA). As the flag carrier of newly independent Croatia, the airline launched its first international service on 5 April 1992, from Zagreb to Frankfurt.

In 1993, two new ATR 42s and two more 737s joined the fleet and representative offices were opened in several European cities and the company bought the travel agency Obzor to organize travel packages for groups and individuals. By 1994, Croatia Airlines had welcomed its millionth passenger. Later that year, Pope John Paul II flew the airline on a trip to Croatia.

In 1995, another ATR 42 was welcomed, as was the two millionth passenger. In 1996, Croatia Airlines became the first airline to fly to Sarajevo after the Bosnian War. In 1997, the airline's first Airbus A320 arrived and was named Rijeka. In 1998, another first plane of a new type arrived when the airline's first Airbus A319 joined the fleet. This airplane was named Zadar. In the same year, Croatia Airlines became a member of the Association of European Airlines (AEA). By 1999, two more Airbus jets had arrived and Croatia Airlines started selling the Boeing part of their fleet. The airline flew its five millionth passenger.

Development since 2000

In 2000, two more Airbus planes arrived and an automated ticketing system was inaugurated. In 2001, the airline received maintenance and technical performing certificates from the German aviation authority Luftfahrt-Bundesamt. On 18 November 2004, Croatia Airlines joined Star Alliance.

Airbus and Croatia Airlines announced on 22 October 2008 the order of four additional 132-seat A319 aircraft, to be delivered from 2013. By March 2009, the airline also retired its fleet of three ATR 42 short-haul aircraft, after operating the type since 1993, and replaced it with a fleet of six Bombardier Dash 8 Q400s, the first of which was delivered in May 2008.

The airline carried its 20,000,000th passenger in July 2009, and has carried well over 1 million passengers annually from 2000.

Croatia Airlines and maintenance partner Lufthansa announced on 23 May 2011 the introduction of new slim-line Recaro economy seats to be retrofitted into certain A320 Family aircraft from summer 2012, increasing seating capacity by two rows.

Losses have been made for several years; in November 2012, the government announced that it would provide HRK 800m ($ 136m) for Croatia Airline to become cost-effective from 2013 on. The government is seeking to restructure the airline, which includes plans to cut its workforce by ten percent within two years and it is also looking for a strategic investor.

In February 2020, Croatia Airlines announced two new seasonal flights to Podgorica and Sofia operated by Bombardier Dash 8 Q400.

In October 2022, Croatia Airlines announced plans to reduce their fleet and replace all current aircraft with six new Airbus A220-300 by 2026. The airline decided against the competing Embraer E2 as it was able to use downpayments for a former and since cancelled order for Airbus A319s nearly 15 years ago. In November 2022, it has been stated that the airline will operate up to 15 A220 with 9 additional aircraft to be leased. In January 2023, a lease was agreed for the first six aircraft of four A220-300 aircraft and two A220-100 aircraft. The lease was concluded with Air Lease Corporation Clover based in the Republic of Ireland as the lessor.

Corporate affairs

Ownership

Croatia Airlines is a joint-stock company. Its share capital amounts to HRK 346.49 millions and is divided into 62.690 millions of ordinary shares.

Business trends
The key trends for Croatia Airlines group over recent years are shown below (as at year ending 31 December):

Destinations

Codeshare agreements
Croatia Airlines has codeshare agreements with the following airlines:

 Air Canada
 Air France
 Air India
 Asiana Airlines
 Austrian Airlines
 Brussels Airlines
 ITA Airways
 KLM Royal Dutch Airlines
 LOT Polish Airlines
 Lufthansa
 Scandinavian Airlines
 Singapore Airlines
 Swiss International Air Lines
 TAP Air Portugal
 Turkish Airlines
 United Airlines

Fleet

Current fleet
, Croatia Airlines fleet consists of the following aircraft:

Former fleet

References

External links

Airlines of Croatia
Airlines established in 1989
Association of European Airlines members
Government-owned airlines
Star Alliance
Croatian brands
Companies based in Zagreb
Government-owned companies of Croatia
Croatian companies established in 1989